Niko Klanšek (born February 20, 1984) is a Slovenian entrepreneur, advisor and investor. In 2017, he became the president of Slovenian basketball club KD Slovan.

References 

1984 births
Living people
People from Kranj
Slovenian businesspeople
Fordham University alumni
Harvard Business School people